Bilney railway station was located on the line between  and . It served the village of West Bilney, and closed in 1866.

History

The Bill for the Lynn and Dereham Railway (L&DR) received Royal Assent on 21 July 1845. The line and its stations were opened on 27 October 1846 as far as Narborough. Bilney station opened with the line. The L&DR was taken over by the East Anglian Railway on 22 July 1847. Nineteen days later, on 10 August 1847, the line reached Swaffham.

References

Former Great Eastern Railway stations
Railway stations in Great Britain opened in 1846
Railway stations in Great Britain closed in 1866
Disused railway stations in Norfolk
1846 establishments in England
1866 disestablishments in England
King's Lynn and West Norfolk